Zaboli Mahallah Qarah Shur (also Romanized as Zābolī Maḥallah Qarah Shūr; also known as Zabolimohleh) is a village in Kongor Rural District, in the Central District of Kalaleh County, Golestan Province, Iran. At the 2006 census, its population was 1,027, in 224 families.

References 

Populated places in Kalaleh County